is a passenger railway station in the town of Daigo, Kuji District, Ibaraki Prefecture, operated by East Japan Railway Company (JR East).

Lines
Fukuroda Station is served by the Suigun Line, and is located 51.8 rail kilometers from the official starting point of the line at Mito Station.

Station layout
The station consists of a single side platform serving traffic in both directions. The station originally was built with two opposed side platforms, and the ruins of the unused platform are still in situ. The station is staffed.

History
Fukuroda Station opened on March 3, 1927. The station was absorbed into the JR East network upon the privatization of the Japanese National Railways (JNR) on April 1, 1987.

Passenger statistics
In fiscal 2019, the station was used by an average of 59 passengers daily (boarding passengers only).

Surrounding area

Fukuroda Falls
 Daigo-Fukuroda Post Office
 Kujigawa River

See also
List of railway stations in Japan

References

External links

 JR East Station information 

Railway stations in Ibaraki Prefecture
Suigun Line
Railway stations in Japan opened in 1927
Daigo, Ibaraki